Anthrenocerus is a genus of beetles in the family Dermestidae, the skin beetles.

Species include:

 Anthrenocerus armstrongi Roach, 2000
 Anthrenocerus arrowi Armstrong, 1949
 Anthrenocerus australis (Hope, 1843)
 Anthrenocerus bicolor Arrow, 1915
 Anthrenocerus blackburni Armstrong, 1943
 Anthrenocerus brindabella Roach, 2000
 Anthrenocerus chalceous Armstrong, 1943
 Anthrenocerus concolorous Armstrong, 1943
 Anthrenocerus condensus Armstrong, 1943
 Anthrenocerus confertus Reitter, 1881
 Anthrenocerus convexus Armstrong, 1943
 Anthrenocerus corrugatus Roach, 2000
 Anthrenocerus decoris Roach, 2000
 Anthrenocerus hirsutus Roach, 2000
 Anthrenocerus intricatus Roach, 2000
 Anthrenocerus maculosus Armstrong, 1943
 Anthrenocerus micus Roach, 2000
 Anthrenocerus nebulosus Roach, 2000
 Anthrenocerus occidentalis Roach, 2000
 Anthrenocerus pilatus Roach, 2000
 Anthrenocerus pinto Roach, 2000
 Anthrenocerus pulchellus Arrow, 1915
 Anthrenocerus quadrifasciatus Blackburn, 1903
 Anthrenocerus schwarzeneggeri Roach, 2000
 Anthrenocerus signatus Armstrong, 1943
 Anthrenocerus stellatus Roach, 2000
 Anthrenocerus stigmacrophilus Armstrong, 1949
 Anthrenocerus terzonatus Blackburn, 1903
 Anthrenocerus tessellatus Roach, 2000
 Anthrenocerus trimaculatus Armstrong, 1943
 Anthrenocerus variabilis Reitter, 1881

References

Dermestidae genera